Anisodactylus agricola is a species of ground beetle in the family Carabidae. It is found in North America.

References

Further reading

 

Anisodactylus
Beetles of North America
Articles created by Qbugbot
Beetles described in 1823
Taxa named by Thomas Say